USA/Mexico is an American noise rock supergroup from Austin, Texas, United States.

History 
The band has their roots in the Austin, Texas noise rock scene, and features Butthole Surfers drummer, King Coffey, lead singer of Drain, Craig Clouse, and Nate Cross of Marriage on bass.

On May 26, 2017, USA/Mexico released their debut album, Laredo. Their second album, Matamoros came out on March 23, 2019.

Discography
 Laredo (2017)
 Matamoros (2019)

References

External links
 Official website

Alternative rock groups from Texas
Musical groups established in 2015
American noise rock music groups
Musical groups from Austin, Texas
Neo-psychedelia groups
Hardcore punk groups from Texas
Music of Austin, Texas
American sludge metal musical groups
2015 establishments in Texas